The parish of Disraeli is located in the Les Appalaches Regional County Municipality in the Chaudière-Appalaches region of Quebec, Canada. It had a population of 1,168 in the Canada 2011 Census.

It was named after British statesman and writer Benjamin Disraeli.

The city of Disraeli forms an enclave in the territory of the parish of Disraeli and the two are separate legal entities.

Demographics 

References

Commission de toponymie du Québec
Ministère des Affaires municipales, des Régions et de l'Occupation du territoire 

Incorporated places in Chaudière-Appalaches
Parish municipalities in Quebec
Canada geography articles needing translation from French Wikipedia